Thomas Baddeley may refer to:
Tom Baddeley (1874–1946), English international footballer
Thomas Baddeley (priest) (fl. 1822), author and Catholic priest